Timothy Alan Ford (October 22, 1951 – February 27, 2015) was a Mississippi politician.

Born in Winter Haven, Florida, Ford grew up in Baldwyn, Mississippi. Ford received his bachelor's degree from the University of Mississippi and his law degree from the University of Mississippi School of Law. He practiced law in Jackson, Mississippi. In 1980, he served in the Mississippi House of Representatives from the Tupelo, Mississippi area and was a Democrat. From 1988 until 2004, Ford served as the speaker of the Mississippi House of Representatives. After his retirement, Ford continued to practice law. He died of a heart attack in Oxford, Mississippi.

References

1951 births
2015 deaths
People from Winter Haven, Florida
University of Mississippi alumni
University of Mississippi School of Law alumni
Mississippi lawyers
Speakers of the Mississippi House of Representatives
Democratic Party members of the Mississippi House of Representatives
People from Baldwyn, Mississippi
20th-century American lawyers